Christopher Lambert (born 1957) is a French actor.

Christopher Lambert may also refer to:

Christopher Lambert (MP) (16th century), English politician
Christopher James Lambert (born 1973), English footballer
Christopher Sebastian Lambert (1935-1981), manager of The Who

See also
Christophe Lambert (disambiguation)
Chris Lambert (disambiguation)